John Perie VC (1831 – 17 September 1874) was a Scottish recipient of the Victoria Cross, the highest and most prestigious award for gallantry in the face of the enemy that can be awarded to British and Commonwealth forces.

Details

Perie was born in Gartly, north-west of Aberdeen on 7 April 1821.

Perie was approximately 25 years old, and a sapper in the Royal Sappers and Miners, British Army during the Crimean War when the following deed took place for which he was awarded the VC.
 
On 18 June 1855 during the Siege of Sevastopol, Sapper Perie showed conspicuous gallantry, with a lieutenant (Gerald Graham) in leading a ladder party at the assault on the Redan. He also volunteered to go with the lieutenant to help bring in a wounded sailor lying in the open, even though he was himself suffering from a musket wound in the side.

He died at 69 East North Street in Aberdeen on 17 September 1874 and was buried in the "Strangers Land" (communal paupers grave) of St Peter's Cemetery in north Aberdeen.

The medal
His Victoria Cross is displayed at the Royal Engineers Museum in Chatham, Kent.

Family

He was married to Isabella Howie (1834-1901) and had four children, most of whom began spelling their name as "Pirie".

References

Monuments to Courage (David Harvey, 1999)
The Register of the Victoria Cross (This England, 1997)
The Sapper VCs (Gerald Napier, 1998)
Scotland's Forgotten Valour (Graham Ross, 1995)

External links
Royal Engineers Museum Sappers VCs
Location of grave and VC medal (Grampian)

British recipients of the Victoria Cross
Crimean War recipients of the Victoria Cross
British Army personnel of the Crimean War
British Army personnel of the Second Opium War
Royal Engineers soldiers
1831 births
1874 deaths
People from Huntly
British Army recipients of the Victoria Cross